Jason Gould (May 27, 1836 – December 2, 1892) was an American railroad magnate and financial speculator who is generally identified as one of the robber barons of the Gilded Age. His sharp and often unscrupulous business practices made him one of the wealthiest men of the late nineteenth century. Gould was an unpopular figure during his life and remains controversial.

Early life and education
Gould was born in Roxbury, New York, to Mary More (1798–1841) and John Burr Gould (1792–1866). His maternal grandfather Alexander T. More was a businessman, and his great-grandfather John More was a Scottish immigrant who founded the town of Moresville, New York. Gould studied at the Hobart Academy in Hobart, New York, paying his way by bookkeeping. As a young boy, he decided that he wanted nothing to do with farming, his father's occupation, so his father dropped him off at a nearby school with fifty cents and a sack of clothes.

Early career

Gould's school principal was credited with getting him a job as a bookkeeper for a blacksmith. A year later, the blacksmith offered him half interest in the blacksmith shop, which he sold to his father during the early part of 1854. Gould devoted himself to private study, emphasizing surveying and mathematics. In 1854, he surveyed and created maps of the Ulster County, New York, area. In 1856, he published History of Delaware County, and Border Wars of New York, which he had spent several years writing. While engaged in surveying he started a side activity financing operators making woodash for tannin used in tanning leather.

In 1856, Gould entered a partnership with Zadock Pratt to create a tanning business in Pennsylvania in an area that was later named Gouldsboro. He eventually bought out Pratt, who retired. In 1856, Gould entered a partnership with Charles Mortimer Leupp, a son-in-law of Gideon Lee and one of the leading leather merchants in the United States. The  partnership was successful, until the Panic of 1857. Leupp lost all his money in that financial crisis, but Gould took advantage of the depreciation in property value and bought up former partnership properties.

Gould also started an ice harvesting industry on the large Gouldsboro lake. In the winter ice was harvested and stored in large ice houses at the side of the lake. He had a railroad line installed next to the lake and he supplied New York City with ice during the summer months.

The Gouldsboro Tannery became a disputed property after Leupp's death. Leupp's brother-in-law David W. Lee was also a partner in Leupp and Gould, and he took armed control of the tannery. He believed that Gould had cheated the Leupp and Lee families in the collapse of the business. Gould eventually took physical possession, but he was later forced to sell his shares in the company to Lee's brother.

Railroad investing
In 1859, Gould began speculative investing by buying stock in small railways. His father-in-law Daniel S. Miller introduced him to the railroad industry by suggesting that Gould help him save his investment in the Rutland and Washington Railroad in the Panic of 1857. Gould purchased stock for 10 cents on the dollar, which left him in control of the company. He engaged in more speculation on railroad stocks in New York City throughout the Civil War, and he was appointed manager of the Rensselaer and Saratoga Railroad in 1863.

The Erie Railroad encountered financial troubles in the 1850s, despite receiving loans from financiers Cornelius Vanderbilt and Daniel Drew. It entered receivership in 1859 and was reorganized as the Erie Railway. Gould, Drew, and James Fisk engaged in stock manipulations known as the Erie War, and Drew, Fisk, and Vanderbilt lost control of the Erie in the summer of 1868, while Gould became its president.

Tammany Hall
It was during the same period that Gould and Fisk became involved with Tammany Hall, the Democratic Party political machine that largely ran New York City at the time. They made its boss, notorious William M. "Boss" Tweed, a director of the Erie Railroad, and Tweed arranged favorable legislation. Tweed and Gould became the subjects of political cartoons by Thomas Nast in 1869. Gould was the chief bondsman in October 1871 when Tweed was held on $1 million bail. Tweed was eventually convicted of corruption and died in jail.

Black Friday

In August 1869, Gould and his partner James Fisk conspired to begin to buy gold in an attempt to illegally corner the market. During this time, Gould used contacts with President Ulysses S. Grant's brother-in-law Abel Corbin to influence the president and his Secretary General Horace Porter. These speculations culminated in the panic of Black Friday on September 24, 1869, when the greenback (cash) premium over face value fell on a gold double eagle from 62 percent to 35 percent. Gould made a small profit from this operation by hedging against his own attempted corner as it was about to collapse, but he lost it in subsequent lawsuits. The gold corner established Gould's reputation in the press as an all-powerful figure who could drive the market up and down at will.  Favored by Tweed Ring judges, the conspiratorial partners escaped prosecution, but the months of economic turmoil that rocked the nation following the failed corner proved both ruinous to farmers and bankrupting of some of Wall Street's most venerable financial institutions.

More railroads

Erie Railroad
In 1873, Gould attempted to take control of the Erie Railroad by recruiting foreign investments from Lord Gordon-Gordon, supposedly a cousin of the wealthy Campbell clan who was buying land for immigrants. He bribed Gordon-Gordon with a million dollars in stock, but Gordon-Gordon was an impostor and cashed the stock immediately. Gould sued him, and the case went to trial in March 1873. In court, Gordon-Gordon gave the names of the Europeans whom he claimed to represent, and he was granted bail while the references were checked. He immediately fled to Canada, where he convinced authorities that the charges were false.

Having failed to convince Canadian authorities to hand over Gordon-Gordon, Gould attempted to kidnap Gordon-Gordon with the help of his associates and future members of Congress Loren Fletcher, John Gilfillan, and Eugene McLanahan Wilson. The group captured him successfully, but they were stopped and arrested by the North-West Mounted Police before they could return to the US. Canadian authorities put them in prison and refused them bail, and this led to an international incident between the United States and Canada. Governor Horace Austin of Minnesota demanded their return when he learned that they had been denied bail, and he put the local militia on full readiness, and thousands of Minnesotans volunteered for an invasion of Canada. After negotiations, the Canadian authorities released them on bail. Gordon-Gordon was eventually ordered to be deported but committed suicide before the order could be carried out.

Western railroads

After being forced out of the Erie Railroad, Gould started to build up a system of railroads in the midwest and west. He took control of the Union Pacific in 1873 when its stock was depressed by the Panic of 1873, and he built a viable railroad that depended on shipments from farmers and ranchers. He immersed himself in every operational and financial detail of the Union Pacific system, building an encyclopedic knowledge and acting decisively to shape its destiny. Biographer Maury Klein states that "he revised its financial structure, waged its competitive struggles, captained its political battles, revamped its administration, formulated its rate policies, and promoted the development of resources along its lines."

By 1879, Gould gained control of three more important western railroads, including the Missouri Pacific Railroad. He controlled 10,000 miles (16,000 km) of railway, about one-ninth of the rail in the United States at that time.  He obtained a controlling interest in the Western Union telegraph company and in the elevated railways in New York City after 1881, and he had controlling interest in 15 percent of the country's railway tracks by 1882. The railroads were making profits and set their own rates, and his wealth increased dramatically. He withdrew from management of the Union Pacific in 1883 amid political controversy over its debts to the federal government, but he realized a large profit for himself. 

n 1889, he organized the Terminal Railroad Association of St. Louis which acquired a bottleneck in east–west railroad traffic at St. Louis, but the government brought an antitrust suit to eliminate the bottleneck control after Gould died.

Personal life

Gould was a member of West Presbyterian Church at 31 West 42nd Street. It later merged with Park Presbyterian to form West-Park Presbyterian.

He married Helen Day Miller (1838–1889) in 1863 and they had six children.

Together with his son George, Gould was a founding member of American Yacht Club. He owned the steam yacht Atalanta (1883).

Gould died of tuberculosis, then referred to as "consumption" on December 2, 1892, and was interred in the Woodlawn Cemetery, The Bronx, New York. His fortune was conservatively estimated for tax purposes at $72 million (equivalent to $ in ), which he willed in its entirety to his family.

At the time of his death, Gould was a benefactor in the reconstruction of the Reformed Church of Roxbury, New York, now known as the Jay Gould Memorial Reformed Church. It is located within the Main Street Historic District and listed on the National Register of Historic Places in 1988. The family mausoleum was designed by Francis O'Hara.

Descendants

Gould married Helen Day Miller (1838–1889) in 1863; they had:

 George Jay Gould I (1864–1923), married Edith M. Kingdon (1864–1921) 
 Kingdon Gould Sr. (1887–1945), married Annunziata Camilla Maria Lucci (1890–1961)
 Jay Gould II (1888–1935), married Anne Douglass Graham
 Marjorie Gould (1891–1955), married Anthony Joseph Drexel II
 Helen, Lady Decies (1893–1931), married John Graham Hope DeLaPoer Horsley Beresford (1866–1945)
 George Jay Gould II (1896–1963), married Laura Carter
 Edith Catherine Gould (1901–1937), married Carroll Livingston Wainwright I (1899–1967), then Sir Hector Murray MacNeal
 Gloria Gould (1906–1943), married Henry A. Bishop II, then Walter McFarlane Barker
 Edwin Gould I (1866–1933), married Sarah Cantine Shrady 
 Edwin Gould Jr. (1894–1917), died on Jekyll Island in 1917
 Frank Miller Gould (c. 1895–1945), married Florence Amelia Bacon, died on January 13, 1945
 Helen Gould (1868–1938), married Finlay Johnson Shepard (1867–1942) They adopted three children.
 Howard Gould (1871–1959), married Viola Katherine Clemmons on October 12, 1898, then actress Grete Mosheim in 1937
 Anna, Duchess de Talleyrand-Périgord (1875–1961), married Paul Ernest Boniface, Comte de Castellane (1867–1932), then Hélie de Talleyrand-Périgord, 5th Duke of Talleyrand, 5th Duc of Dino, 4th Duke von Sagan, and Prince of Sagan (1858–1937). Children with Boniface:
 Marie Louise Boniface de Castellane (1896–?), died during infancy or early childhood
 Antoine Boniface, Marquis de Castellane (1896–1946), married Yvonne Patenôtre
 Georges Paul Ernest Boniface de Castellane (1897 or 1899–1944), married Florinda Fernández y Anchorena (1901–?)
 Georges Gustave Boniface de Castellane (c. 1898 – 1946)
 Jay Boniface de Castellane (1902–1956)
 Children with Talleyrand:
 Howard de Talleyrand, duc de Sagan (1909–1929), he killed himself when told that he could not marry
 Helen Violette de Talleyrand-Périgord (1915–2003), married James Robert de Pourtales on March 29, 1937, then Gaston Palewski (1901–1984)
 Frank Jay Gould (1877–1956), married Helen Kelley; then Edith Kelly; then Florence La Caze (1895–1983)

See also
 Allegheny Transportation Company
 Gouldsboro, Pennsylvania
 Lyndhurst, his country estate on the Hudson River
 Paragould, Arkansas

Citations

General and cited references

Further reading
 Newspaper articles
 Death of Jay Gould in the Brooklyn Eagle
 
 
 

 Books
 
 
 
 
 
 Klein, Maury. "Jay Gould: A Revisionist Interpretation". Business and Economic History 2d ser., 15 (1986): 55–68. .
 
 
 
 Steinmetz, Greg. (2022). American Rascal: How Jay Gould Built Wall Street's Biggest Fortune. Simon & Schuster.

External links

 Excerpts from Gould's New York Times obituary
 Obituary by the Iowa City Daily Citizen
 
 History of Delaware County and Border Wars of New York

1836 births
1892 deaths
American Calvinist and Reformed Christians
American cartographers
American financiers
19th-century American railroad executives
Burials at Woodlawn Cemetery (Bronx, New York)
Burials in the Jay Gould Mausoleum
American people of Scottish descent
19th-century deaths from tuberculosis
Jay Gould
People from Roxbury, New York
Union Pacific Railroad people
Tuberculosis deaths in New York (state)
American Presbyterians
Western Union people
Gilded Age